Naughty but Nice may refer to:

 "Naughty but Nice", a gossip column by Rob Shuter

Film
 Naughty but Nice (1927 film), a 1927 Colleen Moore comedy silent film
 Naughty but Nice (1939 film), a 1939 musical comedy starring Dick Powell
 Naughty but Nice (1947 film), a 1947 traditional animated short film

Music
 Naughty but Nice (album), Sarah Connor's 2005 album
 "Naughty but Nice", Prince Buster's 1975 LP
 "Naughty but Nice", a song by Room 2012 from Elevator

See also 
 Naughty but Mice, a 1939 cartoon by Chuck Jones
 "Naughty but Niece", an episode of Married... with Children
 Nutty but Nice, a short film starring The Three Stooges
 Naughty or Nice (disambiguation)